The European hare (Lepus europaeus), also known as the brown hare, is a species of hare native to Europe and parts of Asia. It is among the largest hare species and is adapted to temperate, open country. Hares are herbivorous and feed mainly on grasses and herbs, supplementing these with twigs, buds, bark and field crops, particularly in winter. Their natural predators include large birds of prey, canids and felids. They rely on high-speed endurance running to escape predation, having long, powerful limbs and large nostrils.

Generally nocturnal and shy in nature, hares change their behaviour in the spring, when they can be seen in broad daylight chasing one another around in fields. During this spring frenzy, they sometimes strike one another with their paws ("boxing"). This is usually not competition between males, but a female hitting a male, either to show she is not yet ready to mate or to test his determination. The female nests in a depression on the surface of the ground rather than in a burrow and the young are active as soon as they are born. Litters may consist of three or four young and a female can bear three litters a year, with hares living for up to twelve years. The breeding season lasts from January to August.

The European hare is listed as being of least concern by the International Union for Conservation of Nature because it has a wide range and is moderately abundant. However, populations have been declining in mainland Europe since the 1960s, at least partly due to changes in farming practices. The hare has been hunted across Europe for centuries, with more than five million being shot each year; in Britain, it has traditionally been hunted by beagling and hare coursing, but these field sports are now illegal. The hare has been a traditional symbol of fertility and reproduction in some cultures and its courtship behaviour in the spring inspired the English idiom mad as a March hare.

Taxonomy and genetics 

The European hare was first described in 1778 by German zoologist Peter Simon Pallas. It shares the genus Lepus (Latin for "hare") with 32 other hare and jackrabbit species, jackrabbits being the name given to some species of hare native to North America. They are distinguished from other leporids (hares and rabbits) by their longer legs and wider nostrils. The Corsican hare, broom hare and Granada hare were at one time considered to be subspecies of the European hare, but DNA sequencing and morphological analysis support their status as separate species.

There is some debate as to whether the European hare and the Cape hare are the same species. A 2005 nuclear gene pool study suggested that they are, but a 2006 study of the mitochondrial DNA of these same animals concluded that they had diverged sufficiently widely to be considered separate species. A 2008 study claims that in the case of Lepus species, with their rapid evolution, species designation cannot be based solely on mtDNA but should also include an examination of the nuclear gene pool. It is possible that the genetic differences between the European and Cape hare are due to geographic separation rather than actual divergence. It has been speculated that in the Near East, hare populations are intergrading and experiencing gene flow. Another 2008 study suggests that more research is needed before a conclusion is reached as to whether a species complex exists; the European hare remains classified as a single species until further data contradicts this assumption.

Cladogenetic analysis suggests that European hares survived the last glacial period during the Pleistocene via refugia in southern Europe (Italian peninsula and Balkans) and Asia Minor. Subsequent colonisations of Central Europe appear to have been initiated by human-caused environmental changes. Genetic diversity in current populations is high with no signs of inbreeding. Gene flow appears to be biased towards males, but overall populations are matrilineally structured. There appears to be a particularly large degree of genetic diversity in hares in the North Rhine-Westphalia region of Germany. It is however possible that restricted gene flow could reduce genetic diversity within populations that become isolated.

Historically, up to 30 subspecies of European hare have been described, although their status has been disputed. These subspecies have been distinguished by differences in pelage colouration, body size, external body measurements, skull morphology and tooth shape.

Sixteen subspecies are listed in the IUCN red book, following Hoffmann and Smith (2005): 

Twenty-nine subspecies of "very variable status" are listed by Chapman and Flux in their book on lagomorphs, including the subspecies above (with the exceptions of L. e. connori, L. e. creticus, L. e. cyprius, L. e. judeae, L. e. rhodius, and L. e. syriacus) and additionally:

Description 

The European hare, like other members of the family Leporidae, is a fast-running terrestrial mammal; it has eyes set high on the sides of its head, long ears and a flexible neck. Its teeth grow continuously, the first incisors being modified for gnawing while the second incisors are peg-like and non-functional. There is a gap (diastema) between the incisors and the cheek teeth, the latter being adapted for grinding coarse plant material. The dental formula is 2/1, 0/0, 3/2, 3/3. The dark limb musculature of hares is adapted for high-speed endurance running in open country. By contrast, cottontail rabbits are built for short bursts of speed in more vegetated habitats. Other adaptions for high speed running in hares include wider nostrils and larger hearts. In comparison to the European rabbit, the hare has a proportionally smaller stomach and caecum.

This hare is one of the largest of the lagomorphs. The skull has nasal bones that are short, but broad and heavy. The supraorbital ridge has well-developed anterior and posterior lobes and the lacrimal bone projects prominently from the anterior wall of the orbit.

The fur colour is grizzled yellow-brown on the back; rufous on the shoulders, legs, neck and throat; white on the underside and black on the tail and ear tips. The fur on the back is typically longer and more curled than on the rest of the body. The European hare's fur does not turn completely white in the winter as is the case with some other members of the genus, although the sides of the head and base of the ears do develop white areas and the hip and rump region may gain some grey.

Distribution and habitat 

The European hare is native to much of continental Europe and part of Asia. Its range extends from northern Spain to southern Scandinavia, eastern Europe, and northern parts of Western and Central Asia. It has been extending its range into Siberia. It may have been introduced to Great Britain by the Romans about 2000 years ago, based on a lack of archaeological evidence before that. It is not present in Ireland, where the mountain hare is the only native hare species. Undocumented introductions probably occurred in some Mediterranean Islands. It has also been introduced, mostly as game animal, to North America in Ontario and New York State, and unsuccessfully in Pennsylvania, Massachusetts, and Connecticut, the Southern Cone in Brazil, Argentina, Uruguay, Paraguay, Bolivia, Chile, Peru and the Falkland Islands, Australia, both islands of New Zealand and the south Pacific coast of Russia.

The European hare primarily lives in open fields with scattered brush for shelter. It is very adaptable and thrives in mixed farmland. With regards to climate, the European hare density was highest in "warm and dry districts with mild winters". In Poland, the European hare is most abundant in areas with few forest edges, perhaps because foxes can use these for cover. It requires cover, such as hedges, ditches and permanent cover areas, because these habitats supply the varied diet it requires, and are found at lower densities in large open fields. Intensive cultivation of the land results in greater mortality of young hares.

In Great Britain, the European hare is seen most frequently on arable farms, especially those with crop rotation and fallow land, wheat and sugar beet crops. In mainly grass farms, its numbers increased with are improved pastures, some arable crops and patches of woodland. It is seen less frequently where foxes are abundant or where there are many common buzzards. It also seems to be fewer in number in areas with high European rabbit populations, although there appears to be little interaction between the two species and no aggression. Although European hares are shot as game when plentiful, this is a self-limiting activity and is less likely to occur in localities where the species is scarce.

Behaviour and life history 

The European hare is primarily nocturnal and spends a third of its time foraging. During daytime, it hides in a depression in the ground called a "form" where it is partially hidden. It is generally thought of as asocial but can be seen in both large and small groups. It communicates with each other by a variety of visual signals. To show interest it raises its ears, while lowering the ears warns others to keep away. When challenging a conspecific, a hare thumps its front feet; the hind feet are used to warn others of a predator. It squeals when hurt or scared, and a female makes "guttural" calls to attract her young. It can live for as long as twelve years.

Food and foraging 

The European hare is primarily herbivorous and forages for wild grasses and weeds. With the intensification of agriculture, it has taken to feeding on crops when preferred foods are not available. During the spring and summer, it feeds on soy, clover and corn poppy as well as grasses and herbs. During autumn and winter, it primarily chooses winter wheat, and is also attracted to piles of sugar beet and carrots provided by hunters. It also eats twigs, buds and the bark of shrubs and young fruit trees during winter. It avoids cereal crops when other more attractive foods are available, and appears to prefer high energy foodstuffs over crude dietary fiber. When eating twigs, it strips off the bark to access the vascular tissues which store soluble carbohydrates. Compared to the European rabbit, food passes through the gut more rapidly in the European hare, although digestion rates are similar. It is sometimes coprophagial eating its own green, faecal pellets to recover undigested proteins and vitamins. Two to three adult hares can eat more food than a single sheep.

European hares forage in groups. Group feeding is beneficial as individuals can spend more time feeding knowing that other hares are being vigilant. Nevertheless, the distribution of food affects these benefits. When food is well-spaced, all hares are able to access it. When food is clumped together, only dominant hares can access it. In small gatherings, dominants are more successful in defending food, but as more individuals join in, they must spend more time driving off others. The larger the group, the less time dominant individuals have in which to eat. Meanwhile, the subordinates can access the food while the dominants are distracted. As such, when in groups, all individuals fare worse when food is clumped as opposed to when it is widely spaced.

Mating and reproduction 

European hares have a prolonged breeding season which lasts from January to August. Females, or does, can be found pregnant in all breeding months and males, or bucks, are fertile all year round except during October and November. After this hiatus, the size and activity of the males' testes increase, signalling the start of a new reproductive cycle. This continues through December, January and February when the reproductive tract gains back its functionality. Matings start before ovulation occurs and the first pregnancies of the year often result in a single foetus, with pregnancy failures being common. Peak reproductive activity occurs in March and April, when all females may be pregnant, the majority with three or more foetuses.

The mating system of the hare has been described as both polygynous (single males mating with multiple females) and promiscuous. Females have six-weekly reproductive cycles and are receptive for only a few hours at a time, making competition among local bucks intense. At the height of the breeding season, this phenomenon is known as "March madness", when the normally nocturnal bucks are forced to be active in the daytime. In addition to dominant animals subduing subordinates, the female fights off her numerous suitors if she is not ready to mate. Fights can be vicious and can leave numerous scars on the ears. In these encounters, hares stand upright and attack each other with their paws, a practice known as "boxing", and this activity is usually between a female and a male and not between competing males as was previously believed. When a doe is ready to mate, she runs across the countryside, starting a chase that tests the stamina of the following males. When only the fittest male remains, the female stops and allows him to copulate. Female fertility continues through May, June and July, but testosterone production decreases in males and sexual behaviour becomes less overt. Litter sizes decrease as the breeding season draws to a close with no pregnancies occurring after August. The testes of males begin to regress and sperm production ends in September.

Does give birth in hollow depressions in the ground. An individual female may have three litters in a year with a 41- to 42-day gestation period. The leverets are fully furred and are precocial, being ready to leave the nest soon after they are born, an adaptation to the lack of physical protection relative to that afforded by a burrow. Leverets disperse during the day and come together in the evening close to where they were born. Their mother visits them for nursing soon after sunset; the young suckle for around five minutes, urinating while they do so, with the doe licking up the fluid. She then leaps away so as not to leave an olfactory trail, and the leverets disperse once more. Young can eat solid food after two weeks and are weaned when they are four weeks old. While young of either sex commonly explore their surroundings, natal dispersal tends to be greater in males. Sexual maturity occurs at seven or eight months for females and six months for males.

Health and mortality 

European hares are large leporids and adults can only be tackled by large predators such as canids, felids and the largest birds of prey. In Poland it was found that the consumption of hares by foxes was at its highest during spring, when the availability of small animal prey was low; at this time of year, hares may constitute up to 50% of the biomass eaten by foxes, with 50% of the mortality of adult hares being caused by their predation. In Scandinavia, a natural epizootic of sarcoptic mange which reduced the population of red foxes dramatically, resulted in an increase in the number of European hares, which returned to previous levels when the numbers of foxes subsequently increased. The golden eagle preys on the European hare in the Alps, the Carpathians, the Apennines and northern Spain. In North America, foxes and coyotes are probably the most common predators, with bobcats and lynx also preying on them in more remote locations.

European hares have both external and internal parasites. One study found that 54% of animals in Slovakia were parasitised by nematodes and over 90% by coccidia. In Australia, European hares were reported as being infected by four species of nematode, six of coccidian, several liver flukes and two canine tapeworms. They were also found to host rabbit fleas (Spilopsyllus cuniculi), stickfast fleas (Echidnophaga myrmecobii), lice (Haemodipsus setoni and H. lyriocephalus), and mites (Leporacarus gibbus).

European brown hare syndrome (EBHS) is a disease caused by a calicivirus similar to that causing rabbit haemorrhagic disease (RHD) and can similarly be fatal, but cross infection between the two mammal species does not occur. Other threats to the hare are pasteurellosis, yersiniosis (pseudo-tuberculosis), coccidiosis and tularaemia, which are the principal sources of mortality.

In October 2018, it was reported that a mutated form of the rabbit haemorrhagic disease virus (RHDV2) may have jumped to hares in the UK. Normally rare in hares, a significant die-off from the virus has also occurred in Spain.

Relationship with humans

In folklore, literature, and art 
In Europe, the hare has been a symbol of sex and fertility since at least Ancient Greece. The Greeks associated it with the gods Dionysus, Aphrodite and Artemis as well as with satyrs and cupids. The Christian Church connected the hare with lustfulness and homosexuality, but also associated it with the persecution of the church because of the way it was commonly hunted.

In Northern Europe, Easter imagery often involves hares or rabbits. Citing folk Easter customs in Leicestershire, England, where "the profits of the land called Harecrop Leys were applied to providing a meal which was thrown on the ground at the 'Hare-pie Bank'", the 19th-century scholar Charles Isaac Elton proposed a possible connection between these customs and the worship of Ēostre. In his 19th-century study of the hare in folk custom and mythology, Charles J. Billson cites folk customs involving the hare around Easter in Northern Europe, and argues that the hare was probably a sacred animal in prehistoric Britain's festival of springtime. Observation of the hare's springtime mating behaviour led to the popular English idiom "mad as a March hare", with similar phrases from the sixteenth century writings of John Skelton and Sir Thomas More onwards. The mad hare reappears in Alice's Adventures in Wonderland by Lewis Carroll, in which Alice participates in a crazy tea-party with the March Hare and the Hatter.

Any connection of the hare to Ēostre is doubtful. John Andrew Boyle cites an etymology dictionary by A. Ernout and A. Meillet, who wrote that the lights of Ēostre were carried by hares, that Ēostre represented spring fecundity, love and sexual pleasure. Boyle responds that almost nothing is known about Ēostre, and that the authors had seemingly accepted the identification of Ēostre with the Norse goddess Freyja, but that the hare is not associated with Freyja either. Boyle adds that "when the authors speak of the hare as the 'companion of Aphrodite and of satyrs and cupids' and 'in the Middle Ages [the hare] appears beside the figure of [mythological] Luxuria', they are on much surer ground."

The hare is a character in some fables, such as The Tortoise and the Hare of Aesop. The story was annexed to a philosophical problem by Zeno of Elea, who created a set of paradoxes to support Parmenides' attack on the idea of continuous motion, as each time the hare (or the hero Achilles) moves to where the tortoise was, the tortoise moves just a little further away. The German Renaissance artist Albrecht Dürer realistically depicted a hare in his 1502 watercolour painting Young Hare.

Food and hunting 

Across Europe, over five million European hares are shot each year, making it probably the most important game mammal on the continent. This popularity has threatened regional varieties such as those of France and Denmark, through large-scale importing of hares from Eastern European countries such as Hungary. Hares have traditionally been hunted in Britain by beagling and hare coursing. In beagling, the hare is hunted with a pack of small hunting dogs, beagles, followed by the human hunters on foot. In Britain, the 2004 Hunting Act banned hunting of hares with dogs, so the 60 beagle packs now use artificial "trails", or may legally continue to hunt rabbits. Hare coursing with greyhounds was once an aristocratic pursuit, forbidden to lower social classes. More recently, informal hare coursing became a lower class activity and was conducted without the landowner's permission; it is also now illegal. In Scotland concerns have been raised over the increasing numbers of hares shot under license.

Hare is traditionally cooked by jugging: a whole hare is cut into pieces, marinated and cooked slowly with red wine and juniper berries in a tall jug that stands in a pan of water. It is traditionally served with (or briefly cooked with) the hare's blood and port wine. Hare can also be cooked in a casserole. The meat is darker and more strongly flavoured than that of rabbits. Young hares can be roasted; the meat of older hares becomes too tough for roasting, and may be slow-cooked.

Status 

The European hare has a wide range across Europe and western Asia and has been introduced to a number of other countries around the globe, often as a game species. In general it is considered moderately abundant in its native range, but declines in populations have been noted in many areas since the 1960s. These have been associated with the intensification of agricultural practices. The hare is an adaptable species and can move into new habitats, but it thrives best when there is an availability of a wide variety of weeds and other herbs to supplement its main diet of grasses. The hare is considered a pest in some areas; it is more likely to damage crops and young trees in winter when there are not enough alternative foodstuffs available.

The International Union for Conservation of Nature has evaluated the European hare's conservation status as being of least concern. However, at low population densities, hares are vulnerable to local extinctions as the available gene pool declines, making inbreeding more likely. This is the case in northern Spain and in Greece, where the restocking by hares brought from outside the region has been identified as a threat to regional gene pools. To counteract this, a captive breeding program has been implemented in Spain, and the relocation of some individuals from one location to another has increased genetic variety. The Bern Convention lists the hare under Appendix III as a protected species. Several countries, including Norway, Germany, Austria and Switzerland, have placed the species on their Red Lists as "near threatened" or "threatened".

References

External links 

 ARKive Photographs Videos
 BBC Wales Nature: Brown hare article
 BBC Wales Nature: Brown hare
  Brown hare and new vegetation

Lepus
Hare, European
Hare, European
Introduced mammals of Australia
Mammals of New Zealand
Mammals of Grenada
Mammals of Barbados
Mammals of Guadeloupe
Mammals of the Caribbean
Fauna of the Falkland Islands
Least concern biota of Asia
Least concern biota of Europe
Mammals described in 1778
Taxa named by Peter Simon Pallas